Extra Virgin is the debut album by British trip hop band Olive, originally released in 1996. The album includes the single "You're Not Alone", which originally reached number 42 in the UK Singles Chart in 1996 and when re-released in 1997 it reached number one. Two other singles were released from the album: "Outlaw" (UK No. 14) and "Miracle" (UK No. 41). The trip hop influence of Massive Attack and Portishead, while in small quantities, are evident, mixed in with synth-based electronic dance.

The album was re-released in 1997 following the success of "You're Not Alone" and peaked at number 15 on the UK Albums Chart.

Recording
Synthesizers used on the album are a Roland Juno-60, an E-mu Systems Vintage Keys, and an Akai S3000XL sampler. Mixing was done on a Mackie mixing console.

The band created some samples by recording live sounds, edited and subsequently filtered.

Track listing

Personnel 
Olive
 Ruth-Ann Boyle – vocals
 Tim Kellett – flugelhorn, keyboards, trumpet
 Robin Taylor-Firth – keyboards

Other musicians
 Darren Campbell – bass guitar
 Duke Quartet – strings:
 Louise Fuller – violin
 Richard Koster – violin
 Ivan McCready – cello
 John Metcalfe – viola
 Tony Foster – bass, guitar
 Adrian Hackett – drums
 George Lambert – digital EQ
 Henrik Linnermann – flute
 James McNichol – assistant engineer
 Omith Mukherjee – guitar
 Heitor Teixeira Pereira – guitar
 Geoff Pesche – mastering
 David F. Revill – engineer
 Mark Sheridan – flute, guitar
 Leon Zervos – mastering

Metcalfe had previously played for The Durutti Column alongside Kellett, as had Pereira for Simply Red.

Charts

References

1996 debut albums
Olive (band) albums